Osteochondropathy refers to a disease ("-pathy") of the bone and cartilage.

However, it is more common to refer to these conditions as one of the following:
 chondropathy (disease of the cartilage)
 A bone disease is also called an "osteopathy", but because the term osteopathy is often used to describe a healthcare approach, use of the term can cause some confusion.

See also
 Osteochondrosis
 Osteochondritis

References

External links 

Chondropathies